Rong Zhang is a Chinese-American physicist and climate scientist at the National Oceanic and Atmospheric Administration. Her research considers the impact of Atlantic meridional overturning circulation on climate phenomena. She was elected Fellow of the American Meteorological Society in 2018 and appointed their Bernhard Haurwitz Memorial Lecturer in 2020.

Early life and education 
Zhang was born in China. She attended Tsinghua University, where she studied electronic engineering. After graduating, she moved to Boston University, where she worked toward a graduate degree in physics. She became interested in careers that combined fundamental science with societal impact. She was a doctoral researcher at Massachusetts Institute of Technology working on climate science.

Research and career 
Zhang joined Princeton University as a postdoctoral fellow in the program in Atmospheric and Oceanic Sciences (AOS). The AOS is a partnership between Princeton and the Geophysical Fluid Dynamics Laboratory (GFDL). She has investigated the role of Atlantic meridional overturning circulation (AMOC) on Atlantic Multidecadal Variability. She has said that this variability could slow the pace of Arctic summer sea icea loss.

Zhang showed that the sea in the Gulf of Maine has warmed faster than 99% of the global ocean, which results in changes in the distribution and species composition. Her climate models, which use a 10 km ocean grid, have ten times the resolution of those developed by the Intergovernmental Panel on Climate Change. She showed that warming in the Northwest Atlantic increases salinity because of a change in water mass distribution (the Labrador Current retreats and the Gulf Stream shifts northerly).

In 2018, Zhang was elected a Fellow of the American Meteorological Society. She was appointed their Bernhard Haurwitz Memorial Lecturer in 2020.

Selected publications

References 

American women physicists
Chinese women physicists
American women scientists
Chinese women scientists
Massachusetts Institute of Technology alumni
MIT Department of Physics alumni
Tsinghua University alumni
Geophysicists
Women geophysicists
American geophysicists
Chinese geophysicists
Chinese American
American Meteorological Society people
Fellows of the American Meteorological Society
Living people
Year of birth missing (living people)